John Eugene Commins (6 November 1941 – 2 January 2013) was a South African cricketer. He played ten first-class matches for Western Province between 1960 and 1969.

Commins, a leg-spin bowler, had a good debut season for Western Province in 1960-61 when he took 22 wickets at an average of 18.50, including his best figures of 5 for 32 against Eastern Province. However, he played only four more first-class matches over the next eight seasons.

He was murdered in Cape Town. He was the uncle of John Commins who played in the Proteas team in 1994 and 1995.

See also
 List of cricketers who were murdered

References

External links
 

1941 births
2013 deaths
South African cricketers
Western Province cricketers
Cricketers from Cape Town
Male murder victims
South African murder victims
People murdered in South Africa